Barry McEvoy is a Northern Irish film actor/writer best known for writing and playing the lead in An Everlasting Piece (2000), directed by Barry Levinson. McEvoy's first screen appearance of note was in the supporting role of a gangster in Gloria (1999), filmed after he had spent a decade performing in Off Broadway plays in New York City. He appeared in Gettysburg (1993), Veronica Guerin (2003), Pirates of the Caribbean: Dead Man's Chest (2006), and Five Minutes of Heaven (2009).

McEvoy based the screenplay of An Everlasting Piece upon the adventures of his own father selling toupées to both Protestants and Catholics in Belfast, Northern Ireland, during the height of the conflict.

Before his career in film, Barry was lead singer for legendary 1980s Washington, D.C., punk band Phlegm, who released several records before disbanding in 1988.

McEvoy lives in Dublin with his wife and son. He continues to do screenwriting and also stars in plays from time to time in both Ireland and the U.S.

Filmography

External links

DVD Verdict: An Everlasting Piece
Phlegm on MySpace Music

Living people
Irish male stage actors
Irish male film actors
1967 births